Seedorf is a municipality in the district of Segeberg, in Schleswig-Holstein, Germany.

Geography
Out of the Seedorf village, the municipality counts 11 civil parishes (Ortsteile): 
Aukamp  
Bahrenkrug (with Blomnath and Heidmoor) 
Berlin  
Fresenfelde 
Hornsmühlen 
Kembs  
Kuhlenbrook
Schlamersdorf (with Reuterteich and Schulbusch)
Seekamp
Weitewelt

Personalities
Ernest Charles Jones (1819-1869), English poet, novelist, and Chartist, native of the village of Berlin

References

External links

 Seedorf official website 
 Amt Trave-Land official website

Municipalities in Schleswig-Holstein
Segeberg